Cannabis in Tonga is illegal, but cultivated illicitly. A 1990s report attributed increased cannabis usage in Tonga to foreign travelers and returned Tongan emigres.

References

Tonga
Drugs in Tonga